Cynon Valley is a constituency represented in the House of Commons of the UK Parliament since 2019 by Beth Winter of the Labour Party.

The Cynon Valley Senedd constituency was created with the same boundaries in 1999 (as an Assembly constituency).

Boundaries

1983–2010: The Borough of Cynon Valley.

2010–present: The Rhondda Cynon Taff County Borough electoral divisions of Aberaman North, Aberaman South, Abercynon, Aberdare East, Aberdare West/Llwydcoed, Cilfynydd, Cwmbach, Glyncoch, Hirwaun, Mountain Ash East, Mountain Ash West, Penrhiwceiber, Pen-y-waun, Rhigos, and Ynysybwl.

The constituency encompasses the towns of Aberdare, Mountain Ash, Cilfynydd, Abercynon and Hirwaun.

Members of Parliament

Elections

Elections in the 1980s

 Death of Ioan Evans 10 February 1984

Elections in the 1990s

Elections in the 2000s

Elections in the 2010s 

   
   

Of the 81 rejected ballots:
59 were either unmarked or it was uncertain who the vote was for.
22 voted for more than one candidate.

See also 
 Cynon Valley (Senedd constituency)
 1984 Cynon Valley by-election
 List of parliamentary constituencies in Mid Glamorgan
 List of parliamentary constituencies in Wales

Notes

References

Further reading
 Britain Votes/Europe Votes By-Election Supplement 1983-, compiled and edited by F.W.S. Craig (Parliamentary Research Services 1985)

External links
Politics Resources (Election results from 1922 onwards)
Electoral Calculus (Election results from 1955 onwards)
2017 Election House Of Commons Library 2017 Election report
A Vision Of Britain Through Time (Constituency elector numbers)

Parliamentary constituencies in South Wales
Constituencies of the Parliament of the United Kingdom established in 1983
Politics of Rhondda Cynon Taf
Mid Glamorgan